Hetty Green (November 21, 1834 – July 3, 1916), was an American businesswoman and financier known as "the richest woman in America" during the Gilded Age. Those who knew her well referred to her admiringly as the Queen of Wall Street due to her willingness to lend freely and at reasonable interest rates to financiers and city governments during financial panics. Her extraordinary discipline during such times enabled her to amass a fortune as a financier at a time when nearly all major financiers were men. Two days after her death on July 3, 1916, The New York Times paid tribute to Green and corrected many common misconceptions, writing:"It was the fact that Mrs. Green was a woman that made her career the subject of endless curiosity, comment, and astonishment...Her habits were the legacy of New England ancestors who had the best of reasons for knowing 'the value of money,' for never wasting it, and for risking it only when their shrewd minds saw an approach to certainty of profit. Though something of hardness was ascribed to her, that she harmed any is not recorded, and victims of ruthlessness are usually audible...That there are few like her is not a cause of regret; that there are many less commendable, is one."Despite Hetty Green's exceptional investment instincts, discreet generosity, and admirable character, most media reports from the era (and soon thereafter) characterized her thrift as evidence of miserliness. She was also referred to often as the Witch of Wall Street, and the Guinness Book of World Records even named her the "greatest miser." Stories that were often cited include her refusal to buy expensive clothes, pay for hot water, and her habit of wearing a single dress that was only replaced when it was worn out.  Yet many of these habits were considered abnormal mainly because the Gilded Age was a time of celebrating excess rather than hiding it. When Hetty Green's life is evaluated in its entirety and in the context of the time period, it is clear that media criticism grossly misrepresented her true character.

Birth and early years

Early Childhood 
Henrietta ("Hetty") Howland Robinson was born in 1834 in New Bedford, Massachusetts, the daughter of Edward Mott Robinson and Abby Howland, the richest whaling family in the city. Her family members were Quakers who owned a large whaling fleet and also profited from the China trade. She had a younger brother who died as an infant.

At the age of two, Hetty was sent to live with her grandfather, Gideon Howland, and her Aunt Sylvia. Hetty would read the stock quotations and commerce reports for her grandfather and picked up some of his business methods. At the age of 10, Hetty entered Eliza Wing's boarding school in Sandwich.  Hetty's father became the head of the Isaac Howland whaling firm upon Gideon's death, and Hetty began to emulate her father's business practices. Because of Gideon's influence and that of her father, and possibly because her mother was constantly ill, she was close to her father and was reading financial papers to him by the age of six. Hetty learned to read ledgers and trade commodities. When she was 13, Hetty became the family bookkeeper. Hetty accompanied her father to the countinghouses, storerooms, commodities traders, and stockbrokers.  In the evening, she read him the news.

Early Adulthood 
In her late teens, Hetty attended multiple boarding schools and finishing schools, such as the Friends Academy and Anna Cabot Lowell's finishing school. Simultaneously, she assisted her father with the management of the family business. The unifying theme throughout this period of her life was her unapologetic rejection of societal norms established for woman at the time — especially wealthy heiresses. Hetty cared little for her personal appearance, preferring to dress in old clothes, and she disregarded the daily primping practiced by young women. Hetty’s behavior frustrated her mother and Aunt Sylvia because they feared what the future would hold for a wealthy heiress who felt more at home on the docks of New Bedford than mingling with members of her class.

When Hetty turned 20-years old, her Aunt Sylvia pressured her to find a spouse. Reluctantly, Hetty moved to New York to live with a cousin of her mother's, Henry Grinnell. During her time in New York, she mingled with the upper crust of New York Society and attended many lavish balls. But she expressed little interest in finding a husband. Instead, she spent much of her time eavesdropping on men as they discussed the latest Wall Street dramas. Her relatives were exasperated when Hetty returned several months early to New Bedford with no wedding prospects. Her father was the only person unable to contain his delight when he learned that Hetty had spent only $200 out of her $1,200 budget, investing the remainder in high-quality bonds.

Adulthood and Marriage 
Within a few years of her return to New Bedford, Hetty’s father exited the whaling business and relocated to New York City. His exit was well-timed, as the use of petroleum virtually eliminated demand for whale oil within a few years. Hetty spent the next six years shuttling between New York City and New Bedford. Her priority in New York was assisting her father with new business and investment activities, while her priority in New Bedford was pestering her Aunt Sylvia to ensure that she remained the sole beneficiary on her will. The constant fights over Aunt Sylvia’s will led to a drawn-out court battle, which haunted Hetty for the remainder of her life. Hetty's mother, Abby Robinson, died on February 21, 1860, but her $100,000 estate went to her husband, except for an $8,000 house for Hetty.

While residing in New York City, Hetty met her future husband, Edward Henry Green of Vermont. By the age of 44, Edward was a partner in Russell Sturgis & Company, and had become a millionaire in his own right from his business endeavors in the Far East. Edward Robinson encouraged their marriage but with the clear stipulation that Edward Green would not inherit Hetty's money. Specifically, the will stated that it was to be "free from the debts, control or interference of any such husband." With Hetty's inheritance safe, Edward Robinson encouraged the marriage, as he was concerned with his declining health and about Hetty’s ability to manage the family business in his absence.

In May 1865, Hetty and Edward announced their engagement, but soon thereafter, Hetty's father and Aunt Silvia passed away. Although Hetty was the primary beneficiary on both estates, most of the assets were placed into trust, entitling Hetty only to the income. Edward Robinson's estate was estimated to be $6 million, but all but $1 million was placed in a trust that only entitled Hetty to the income.  Sylvia Howland had willed half of her $2 million estate to charities and entities in the town of New Bedford; the rest was placed in a trust for Hetty, but once again without her control of the principal.  This enraged Hetty because she believed that she could invest the assets more effectively and at much lower cost – a claim she later proved beyond any shadow of a doubt.

Hetty was especially angered by Sylvia’s will, and she initiated a drawn-out court case disputing its legitimacy. The executor of Howland's will, Thomas Mandell, rejected Hetty's claim that an addendum to the will granted almost the entire estate to her. Mandell claimed that the addendum was a forgery, and it was challenged in court. The case, Robinson v. Mandell, remains notable as an early example of the forensic use of mathematics. The case was ultimately decided against Robinson after the court ruled that the addendum and signature were forgeries. Hetty settled the case for a smaller percentage of the estate (approximately $600,000), which was placed in trust. 

Exhausted from lawsuits and concerned about an effort by Hetty's cousins tried to have her indicted for forgery based on the Robinson v. Mandell decision, the couple moved overseas to London, where they lived in the Langham Hotel.   Hetty and Edward Green departed the U.S. for London soon after their wedding on July 11 1867. When Their two children, Edward Howland Robinson Green (called Ned) and Harriet Sylvia Ann Howland Green Wilks (called Sylvia), were born in London: Ned on August 23, 1868, and Sylvia on January 7, 1871.

Investing career
Green followed a contrarian investing strategy, in her words, "I buy when things are low and nobody wants them. I keep them until they go up and people are crazy to get them. That is, I believe, the secret of all successful business."  Green invested the interest from her father's trust fund, once again investing as her father had done, in Civil War bonds, which paid a high yield in gold, augmented by railroad stocks.  Her annual profits during her first year in London amounted to $1.25 million, while the most she ever earned in a day was $200,000.  Green went on to say, "I believe in getting in at the bottom and out on top. I like to buy railroad stocks or mortgage bonds. When I see a good thing going cheap because nobody wants it, I buy a lot of it and tuck it away."  Hetty's discounted greenbacks, bought during the Civil War, were increased in value when Congress passed legislation in 1875 backing them with gold.  As Hetty said of her investing philosophy, "Before deciding on an investment, I seek out every kind of information about it."

When the Green family returned to the United States in October 1873, after Edward suffered losses on Wall Street, they settled in Edward's hometown of Bellows Falls, Vermont. Hetty quarreled with Edward's mother until her death in 1875.  That same year, Hetty covered Edward's losses associated with the London and San Francisco Bank, of which he was one of the directors.  Hetty bailed Edward out once again in 1884.

After the 1885 collapse of the financial house John J. Cisco & Son, of which Edward was a partner, it was disclosed Edward had $700,000 in debt. Hetty Green's $500,000 represented one-quarter of the bank's assets.  The bank refused to allow her transfer of her $26 million in stocks, bonds, mortgages, and deeds to the Chemical National Bank, until Edward's debt was paid.  In the end, Hetty made the transfer and paid off her husband's debt, but never forgave Edward.

Green set up an office in the Chemical Bank, but continued to live in boarding houses, flats, or hotels. By then she was known as the "Queen of Wall Street." Her investing philosophy, in her words, included, "In business generally, don't close a bargain until you have reflected on it overnight."  She also thought, "It is the duty of every woman, I believe, to learn to take care of her own business affairs," and "A girl should be brought up as to be able to make her own living..."  "Whether rich or poor, a young woman should know how a bank account works, understand the composition of mortgages and bonds, and know the value of interest and how it accumulates."

The Panic of 1907 provided an opportunity for Green to showcase many of the investment skills that she had accumulated over several decades. Unlike most Wall Street financiers, Green predicted the panic long before its arrival. She explained her foresight, stating, “I saw this situation developing three years ago, and I am on record as predicting it. I said the rich were approaching the brink, and that a ‘panic’ was inevitable.“ For several years prior to the panic, Green amassed a large cash position. When the panic arrived in October 1907, Green lent liberally to financiers and the City of New York to get them through the crisis. She was also the only woman invited to the critical meeting with J. Pierpont Morgan and the leading banking executives at the height of the crisis.

Investment Strategy

Green conducted much of her business at the offices of the Seaboard National Bank in New York, surrounded by trunks and suitcases full of her papers; she did not want to pay rent for her own office. Possibly because of her usually dour dress (due mainly to frugality, but perhaps in part related to her Quaker upbringing), she was given the nickname "the Witch of Wall Street".

Green was a successful businesswoman who dealt mainly in real estate, invested in railroads and mines, and lent money while acquiring numerous mortgages. The City of New York came to Green for loans to keep the city afloat on several occasions, most particularly during the Panic of 1907; she wrote a check for $1.1 million and took her payment in short-term revenue bonds. Keenly detail-oriented, she would travel thousands of miles alone—in an era when few women would dare travel unescorted—to collect a debt of a few hundred dollars.

Ken Fisher discusses Green in his 2007 book 100 Minds That Made the Market. Fisher argues that despite her eccentricities, Green was in many ways a better investor than most of her early Wall Street contemporaries. Green clearly understood the power of compound interest, and her focus on regular modest gains of 6% a year and frugal living made her fortune more durable than the likes of Jesse Livermore who repeatedly earned larger sums on more extravagant deals but also went bankrupt through excessive spending and high-risk investments.

Reputation

Thrift

Hetty Green's thrift was legendary, but was often misunderstood. The Gilded Age was an era known for its excesses, and Hetty Green was among the few investors who chose not to partake. Nevertheless, journalists often presented her thriftiness as evidence of her miserliness, ignoring the fact that it was often a virtue and played an important role in her investing strategy. Examples of negative portrayals in the media included reports that she never turned on the heat or used hot water. She was also known for wearing a single black dress that she would not replace until it was thoroughly worn out. Moreover, she reportedly instructed her laundress to wash only the dirtiest parts of her dresses (the hems) to save money on soap. The most vicious accusation, however, was that she neglected to treat her son's injured leg, which eventually resulted in an amputation. The evidence cited is her refusal to pay for a visit to a single physician. But this accusation ignores substantial evidence that Hetty Green spared little expense and effort to treat her son. This included visits to multiple specialists, as well as temporarily relocating her residence so that she could care for him.

Hetty's personal perspective on thrift differed markedly from that of the public. There is considerable evidence that her frugality was passed down from her father, who was also a successful investor. She once explained her thrift by recounting an explanation offered by her father after he rejected an expensive cigar that was offered to him. He explained the decision by stating, “I smoke four cent cigars and I like them. If I were to smoke better ones, I might lose my taste for the cheap ones that I now find quite satisfactory.” Green's thrift also reflected her Quaker upbringing. When a reporter questioned why Hetty Green had spent so little time during a visit to an expensive hotel, she responded "Young man, I am a Quaker, and I am trying to live up to the tenets of that faith. That is why I dress plainly and live quietly. No other kind of life would please me." Finally, Green’s thrift was essential to her investment strategy, as it enabled her to buy assets confidently in the midst of financial panics because she knew that she could live on minimal living expenses. The importance of thrift to a value investor is a point that is often missed when evaluating Hetty Green’s life.

Media Portrayal

Green was often portrayed negatively in the media. Yet her investment strategy shunned the nefarious tactics that were commonly used by Wall Street speculators, such as Daniel Drew, Jay Gould, and Jim Fisk. She once commented on this misperception, stating "It has turned out...that my life is written for me down in Wall Street by people who, I assume, do not care to know one iota of the real Hetty Green. I am in earnest; therefore they picture as heartless. I go my own way, take no partners, risk nobody else's fortune, therefore I am Madame Ishmael, set against every man." In Green's words, "I don't think society means what some rich people would have us believe, I should get very tired of living in one of the great houses in New York, going out all night and sleeping all day. They don't have any real pleasure. It's intercourse with people that I like."  Yet she was also a secret philanthropist, avoiding the attention of the press.  In her words, "I believe in discreet charity."  Hetty also had the reputation of being an effective nurse, caring for her young (apparently with the exception of her son Ned (see above)) and old neighbors.  Her favorite poem was William Henry Channing's "My Symphony," which starts with "To live content with small means..."

Despite the strength of her ethics relative to her peers, Green entered the lexicon of turn-of-the-century America with the popular phrase "I'm not Hetty if I do look green." O. Henry used this phrase in his 1890s story "The Skylight Room" when a young woman, negotiating the rent on a room in a rooming house owned by an imperious old lady, wishes to make it clear she is neither as rich as she appears nor as naive.

Later life
As a young man, Ned Green moved away from his mother to manage the family's properties in Chicago and, later, Texas. In middle age, he returned to New York; his mother lived her final months with him.

Green's daughter Sylvia lived with her mother until her thirties. Green disapproved of all of her daughter's suitors, suspecting that they were after her fortune. Sylvia finally married Matthew Astor Wilks on February 23, 1909, after a two-year courtship. A minor heir to the Astor fortune, Wilks entered the marriage with $2 million of his own, enough to assure Green that he was not a gold digger. Nonetheless, she compelled him to sign a prenuptial agreement waiving his right to inherit Sylvia's fortune.

When her grown children left home, Green moved repeatedly among small apartments in Brooklyn Heights and after 1898, in Hoboken, New Jersey, mainly to avoid New York's property tax, though she did loan money to the city at reasonable rates.  Hetty then regularly commuted to her office in the Chemical Bank on Broadway.  By 1905, Hetty was New York's largest lender. Unsubstantiated rumors claimed that she ate only oatmeal, eggs, and onions, unheated so as not to increase her fuel bill. 

In her old age, Green developed a hernia, but refused to have an operation, preferring to use a stick to press down the swelling.  She eventually moved her office to the National Park Bank, when she thought she had been poisoned at the Chemical Bank, a fear she had most of her life.

Death
On July 3, 1916, Green died at age 81 at her son's New York City home. According to her longstanding "World's Greatest Miser" entry in the Guinness Book of World Records, she died of apoplexy after arguing with a maid over the virtues of skimmed milk. The New York Times reported she suffered a series of strokes leading up to her death.

Upon her death, Green was known as the "Wizard of Finance" and the "Richest Woman in America." Estimates of her net worth ranged from $100 million to $200 million (equivalent to $ to $ in ), making her arguably the richest woman in the world at the time.

Green was buried at the Immanuel Cemetery at the Immanuel Episcopal Church in Bellows Falls, Vermont, next to her husband. She had converted late in life to his Episcopalian faith so that she could be interred with him. Their two children split her estate, which included a ten-year trust for Sylvia administered by Ned. They were reported to have enjoyed their wealth more than she had. Both came through the Great Depression relatively unscathed by following Hetty's philosophy of conservative buying backed by substantial cash reserves.  Ned was an accomplished collector with interests in everything from auto racing to science to horticulture. He willed his estate to his sister Sylvia, who in 1948 donated his Round Hill, Massachusetts, estate to the Massachusetts Institute of Technology (MIT), which used the property for experiments. These included a prototype particle accelerator. They used his powerful WMAF radio transmitters to keep in touch with Richard E. Byrd's 1928–1930 Antarctic expedition.

Sylvia Green died in 1951, leaving an estimated $200 million and donating all but $1,388,000 to 64 colleges, churches, hospitals, and other charities. Both children were buried near their parents in Bellows Falls.

Legacy
The She-Wolf (1931) and You Can't Buy Everything (1934) was the story of a miserly billionaire businesswoman based on Green. She was played by Australian-born actress May Robson.

Green's former mansion in Englewood, New Jersey was purchased by the Actors Fund in 1928 and currently houses the Lillian Booth Actors Home.

Sylvia Wilks had no heirs and her fortune was distributed to 64 different charities. A partial list of institutions that received distributions is provided below.

1. The Academy of St. Joseph (New York)</p>
2. American Red Cross (Washington, DC) </p>
3.	American Society for the Prevention of Cruelty to Animals (New York) </p>
4.	The Blair Academy (New Jersey) </p>
5.	Christ Church (Connecticut) </p>
6.	City of New Bedford (Wilks) Library (Massachusetts) </p>
7.	Columbia University (New York) </p>
8.	Fire Department’s Honor Emergency Fund (New York) </p>
9.	Fordham University (New York) </p>
10.	The General Theological Seminary (New York) </p>
11.	The Girl Scouts of America (New York) </p>
12.	The Groton School (Connecticut) </p>
13.	Harvard College (Massachusetts) </p>
14.	Immanuel Episcopal Church (Vermont) </p>
15.	Institute for Crippled and Disabled (New York) </p>
16.	The Johns Hopkins University and Hospital (Maryland) </p>
17.	The Kent School (Connecticut) </p>
18. Lenox Hill Hospital (New York) </p>
19.	Massachusetts Institute of Technology (Massachusetts) </p>
20. Middlebury College (Vermont) </p>
21.	New York Society Library (New York) </p>
22.	New York University (New York) </p>
23.	NYU Bellevue Medical Center (New York) </p>
24.	Sheltering Arms Children’s Service (New York) </p>
25.	Stevens Institute of Technology (New Jersey) </p>
26.	St. Bartholomew’s Church (New York) </p>
27.	St. George’s Church (New York) </p>
28.	St. Ann’s Protestant Episcopal Church (New York) </p>
29.	St. Luke’s Home for Aged Women (New York) </p>
30.	St. Luke’s Hospital (Massachusetts) </p>
31.	St. James Church (New York) </p>
32.	St. Paul’s School (New Hampshire) </p>
33.	St. Peter’s Protestant Episcopal Church (New Jersey) </p>
34.	Vassar College (New York) </p>
35.	Yale University (Connecticut) </p>

See also
 Business magnate
 Collyer brothers, New York City misers and hoarders
 Countess Annie Leary

References

Further reading
 Caplan, Sheri J. Petticoats and Pinstripes: Portraits of Women in Wall Street's History. Praeger, 2013. .
 Ford, Carol. "Hetty Green, A Character Study". National Magazine, September 1905.
 Lewis, Arthur H. The Day They Shook the Plum Tree. New York: Harcourt Brace. (1963);  Buccaneer Books, Cutchogue, NY (1990)  .
 Leila Schneps and Coralie Colmez, Math on trial. How numbers get used and abused in the courtroom, Basic Books, 2013. . (Ninth chapter: "Math error number 9: choosing a wrong model. The case of Hetty Green: a battle of wills").
 Slack, Charles. Hetty: The Genius and Madness of America's First Female Tycoon. New York: Ecco (2004). .
 
 Higgins, Mark. “The Story of Hetty Green: America’s First Value Investor and Financial Grandmaster.” Financial History. Museum of American Finance. (Fall 2022). https://fhmagazine.org/mag/0907949001668081456/p13

External links

 A more generous profile: "Shrewdness and Gumption"
 Wealthy eccentrics, Hetty Green, CNNMoney.com
 WallStreetCosmos.Com: Hetty Green, Witch or Wizard?
 

1834 births
1916 deaths
19th-century American businesspeople
19th-century American businesswomen
19th-century American Episcopalians
20th-century American businesspeople
20th-century American businesswomen
American financial businesspeople
American investors
American Quakers
Burials in Vermont
Businesspeople from Massachusetts
Converts to Anglicanism from Quakerism
Misers
People from Bellows Falls, Vermont
People from Brooklyn Heights
People from Hoboken, New Jersey
People from New Bedford, Massachusetts
People from Englewood, New Jersey
American women investors
Gilded Age